Bryan Caraway (born August 4, 1984) is an American mixed martial artist currently competing in Battlefield Fighting Championship. A professional MMA competitor since 2005, Caraway has fought in the UFC, Strikeforce, EliteXC, and the WEC. He was a competitor on Spike TV's The Ultimate Fighter: Team Bisping vs. Team Miller.

Background
Caraway's father is a two-time Purple Heart recipient and a Vietnam veteran. Caraway is from Goldendale, Washington, and attended North Idaho College for one year and then went to Central Washington University for three and half years, where he was on the wrestling team until the program was dropped in 2004, due to lack of talent on the team. One of Caraway's teammates, a cousin of UFC veteran Dennis Hallman, introduced Caraway to the MMA veteran, who was also an accomplished fighter. Caraway began fighting in the spring of 2004 and then moved to train in his hometown of Yakima, WA.

Mixed martial arts career

Early career
Caraway decided to go professional after compiling a 6-1 amateur record in his home state of Washington. His opponent for his debut would be fellow future UFC fighter, Ian Loveland. Caraway lost when the cage side doctor halted the bout because of a deep laceration on the face of Caraway. Caraway built his record to 4-1 with four straight wins, finishing all four opponents, one of which was soon-to-be Ultimate Fighter and WEC fighter, Noah Thomas.

Caraway took on yet another future UFC fighter in John Gunderson, losing via submission in round two. Caraway bounced back after his second loss, and went on to win six straight fights, again, finishing all of his opponents. Riding a six fight win streak, and boasting a 10–2 record earned Caraway a contract with Strikeforce. His Strikeforce debut came at Strikeforce: Melendez vs. Thomson where he defeated Alvin Cacdac. Caraway then fought for EliteXC, being defeated by their future champion, Wilson Reis. Caraway fought one more time for Strikeforce before signing with World Extreme Cagefighting in 2010.

Bryan Caraway is managed by Daniel A. Martinez of Di-Cypher & Associates.

World Extreme Cagefighting
Caraway was defeated via first round submission in his WEC debut against Mark Hominick on January 10, 2010, at WEC 46.

Caraway was expected to face Fredson Paixão on March 6, 2010, at WEC 47. However, an injury forced Caraway to withdraw and was replaced by Courtney Buck. Caraway instead fought Paixao on the WEC 50 card, and was defeated via split decision. Caraway was released from his contract after the back-to-back losses.

Post-WEC
Caraway defeated Marlin "Pit Bull" Weikel via rear naked choke on February 19, 2011, at CageSport MMA XIII.

The Ultimate Fighter
In 2011, Caraway had signed with the UFC to compete in The Ultimate Fighter: Team Bisping vs. Team Miller. In the first episode, Caraway fought Eric Marriott to gain entry into the Ultimate Fighter house. Caraway defeated Marriott via unanimous decision (20-18, 20-18, 20-18).

Caraway was picked as the second featherweight on Team Mayhem and the fourth overall. In the first preliminary bout of the season, Caraway was selected to fight Marcus Brimage. Caraway controlled Brimage on the ground throughout the first round, and in the second round won the fight via submission (rear-naked choke) to move onto the semi-finals. In the semi-finals, Caraway fought Diego Brandao, losing the fight via TKO (punches) in round one.

Ultimate Fighting Championship
Caraway made his UFC debut on December 3, 2011, at The Ultimate Fighter 14 Finale and fought against fellow Ultimate Fighter castmate, Dustin Neace. Caraway won the fight via submission (rear-naked choke) in the second round. A week before the fight Caraway was severely ill and almost had to pull out of the fight.

Caraway made his Bantamweight debut against Mitch Gagnon on July 21, 2012, at UFC 149. He won via rear naked choke submission in round three.

Caraway was expected to face Mike Easton on December 8, 2012, at UFC on Fox 5, replacing an injured T.J. Dillashaw.  However, on November 21, Caraway pulled out of the bout and was replaced by Raphael Assunção.

Caraway faced Takeya Mizugaki on March 3, 2013, at UFC on Fuel TV 8. He lost the fight via split decision.
Caraway faced Johnny Bedford on April 27, 2013, at UFC 159, replacing an injured Érik Pérez. He won the back-and-forth fight via submission in the third round. Caraway was awarded Submission of the Night honors after the original bonus winner, Pat Healy had the award rescinded after testing positive for marijuana.

Caraway was expected to face Lucas Martins on February 22, 2014, at UFC 170.  However, Caraway pulled out of the bout citing an injury and was replaced by UFC newcomer Aljamain Sterling.

Caraway faced Érik Pérez on June 7, 2014, at UFC Fight Night 42. After controlling the majority of the bout with his wrestling and grappling, Caraway won the fight via rear-naked choke in round 2. There was some controversy after the fight however, as during round 1, Caraway could be seen illegally fish-hooking Perez without the referee noticing.

Caraway faced Raphael Assunção on October 4, 2014, at UFC Fight Night: MacDonald vs. Saffiedine He lost the fight via unanimous decision.

Caraway faced Eddie Wineland on July 25, 2015, at UFC on Fox 16. He won the fight by unanimous decision.

Caraway next faced Aljamain Sterling on May 29, 2016, at UFC Fight Night 88. He won the fight via split decision.

Caraway was expected to face Jimmie Rivera on January 15, 2017, at UFC Fight Night 103. However, Caraway pulled out of the bout on January 4 citing an undisclosed injury. He was replaced by Marlon Vera. Eventually, Rivera withdrew from the fight as he felt going from a top-5 ranked fighter to an unranked one wouldn't make sense at that moment.

Caraway was expected to face Luke Sanders on December 9, 2017, at UFC Fight Night 123. On November 20, Caraway pulled out of the fight with undisclosed reason.

Caraway faced Cody Stamann on March 3, 2018, at UFC 222. He lost the fight by split decision.

Caraway faced Pedro Munhoz on November 30, 2018, at The Ultimate Fighter 28 Finale. He lost the fight via technical knockout in round one.

Battlefield Fighting Championship
On May 25, 2019, news surfaced that Caraway had parted ways with the UFC and signed a contract with South Korean MMA promotion Battlefield Fighting Championship and made his promotional debut against Raja Shippen on July 27, 2019. Caraway won by unanimous decision.

Championships and awards
Ultimate Fighting Championship
Fight of the Night (One time)
Submission of the Night (One time)

Personal life
Caraway, after a five-year relationship, became engaged to Abbey Garrabrandts in March 2021 in Mexico. They have a daughter born January 22, 2022.  
Caraway previously dated former UFC fighter Miesha Tate. They had been together since attending Central Washington University. In 2014, Bryan Caraway was credited with saving the life of his mother, Chris Caraway, when the latter suffered an asthma attack while scuba diving.

In February 2021, Caraway and Tate began a legal battle over assets acquired during their 10 year relationship.  Polaris RZR ATV that he allegedly stole back from his ex-girlfriend Miesha Tate after she first stole the ATV from his residence. 

Caraway is featured in the award-winning mixed martial arts documentary Fight Life. Released in 2013, the film is directed by indie filmmaker James Z. Feng and produced by RiLL Films.

Mixed martial arts record

|Win
|align=center|22–9
|Raja Shippen
| Decision (unanimous)
|Battlefield FC 2
|
|align=center|3
|align=center|5:00
|Macau, China
|
|- 
|Loss
|align=center|21–9
|Pedro Munhoz
|TKO (body kick and punches)
|The Ultimate Fighter: Heavy Hitters Finale 
|
|align=center|1
|align=center|2:39
|Las Vegas, Nevada, United States 
|
|- 
|Loss
|align=center| 21–8
|Cody Stamann
|Decision (split)
|UFC 222 
|
|align=center|3
|align=center|5:00
|Las Vegas, Nevada, United States
|
|-
|Win
|align=center| 21–7
|Aljamain Sterling
|Decision (split)
|UFC Fight Night: Almeida vs. Garbrandt
|
|align=center|3
|align=center|5:00
|Las Vegas, Nevada, United States
|
|-
| Win
| align=center| 20–7
| Eddie Wineland
| Decision (unanimous)
| UFC on Fox: Dillashaw vs. Barão 2
| 
| align=center|3
| align=center|5:00
| Chicago, Illinois, United States
|
|-
| Loss
| align=center| 19–7
| Raphael Assunção
| Decision (unanimous)
| UFC Fight Night: MacDonald vs. Saffiedine
| 
| align=center| 3
| align=center| 5:00
| Halifax, Nova Scotia, Canada
| 
|-
| Win
| align=center| 19–6
| Érik Pérez
| Submission (rear-naked choke)
| UFC Fight Night: Henderson vs. Khabilov
| 
| align=center| 2
| align=center| 1:52
| Albuquerque, New Mexico, United States
| 
|-
| Win
| align=center| 18–6
| Johnny Bedford
| Submission (guillotine choke)
| UFC 159
| 
| align=center| 3
| align=center| 4:44
| Newark, New Jersey, United States
| 
|-
| Loss
| align=center| 17–6
| Takeya Mizugaki
| Decision (split)
| UFC on Fuel TV: Silva vs. Stann
| 
| align=center| 3
| align=center| 5:00
| Saitama, Japan
| 
|-
| Win
| align=center| 17–5
| Mitch Gagnon
| Submission (rear-naked choke)
| UFC 149
| 
| align=center| 3
| align=center| 1:39
| Calgary, Alberta, Canada
| 
|-
| Win
| align=center| 16–5
| Dustin Neace
| Submission (rear-naked choke)
| The Ultimate Fighter: Team Bisping vs. Team Miller Finale
| 
| align=center| 2
| align=center| 3:38
| Las Vegas, Nevada, United States
| 
|-
| Win
| align=center| 15–5
| Marlin Weikel
| Submission (rear-naked choke)
| CageSport 13
| 
| align=center| 1
| align=center| 3:17
| Tacoma, Washington, United States
| 
|-
| Loss
| align=center| 14–5
| Fredson Paixão
| Decision (split)
| WEC 50
| 
| align=center| 3
| align=center| 5:00
| Las Vegas, Nevada, United States
| 
|-
| Loss
| align=center| 14–4
| Mark Hominick
| Submission (armbar)
| WEC 46
| 
| align=center| 1
| align=center| 3:48
| Sacramento, California, United States
| 
|-
| Win
| align=center| 14–3
| Eddie Pelczynski
| Submission (triangle choke)
| CageSport 7
| 
| align=center| 1
| align=center| 3:55
| Tacoma, Washington, United States
| 
|-
| Win
| align=center| 13–3
| Alex Zuniga
| Decision (unanimous)
| Strikeforce Challengers: Villasenor vs. Cyborg
| 
| align=center| 3
| align=center| 5:00
| Kent, Washington, United States
| 
|-
| Win
| align=center| 12–3
| Daniel Stenovich
| Submission (triangle choke)
| CageSport MMA
| 
| align=center| 1
| align=center| 1:47
| Tacoma, Washington, United States
| 
|-
| Loss
| align=center| 11–3
| Wilson Reis
| Decision (unanimous)
| EliteXC: Unfinished Business
| 
| align=center| 3
| align=center| 5:00
| Stockton, California, United States
| 
|-
| Win
| align=center| 11–2
| Alvin Cacdac
| Submission (rear-naked choke)
| Strikeforce: Melendez vs. Thomson
| 
| align=center| 1
| align=center| 1:39
| San Jose, California, United States
| 
|-
| Win
| align=center| 10–2
| Steve Sharp
| Submission (triangle choke)
| International Fighting Championship: Caged Combat
| 
| align=center| 2
| align=center| 2:35
| Nampa, Idaho, United States
| 
|-
| Win
| align=center| 9–2
| Dave Lehr Cochran
| Submission (rear-naked choke)
| Sport Fight 21: Seasons Beatings
| 
| align=center| 2
| align=center| 4:15
| Portland, Oregon, United States
| 
|-
| Win
| align=center| 8–2
| Eddy Belen
| TKO (punches)
| SF: Clash at the Casino 2
| 
| align=center| 1
| align=center| 1:29
| Pendleton, Oregon, United States
| 
|-
| Win
| align=center| 7–2
| Saul Mitchell
| Submission (armbar)
| MMAC: The Revolution
| 
| align=center| 1
| align=center| 3:04
| Washington, D.C., United States
| 
|-
| Win
| align=center| 6–2
| Harris Norwood
| Submission (rear-naked choke)
| Lords of the Cage
| 
| align=center| 2
| align=center| 4:00
| Anacortes, Washington, United States
| 
|-
| Win
| align=center| 5–2
| Andy Lukesh
| Submission (rear-naked choke)
| Sport Fight 18: Turning Point
| 
| align=center| 2
| align=center| 4:30
| Portland, Oregon, United States
| 
|-
| Loss
| align=center| 4–2
| John Gunderson
| Submission (armbar)
| Desert Brawl: Oregon vs. Texas
| 
| align=center| 2
| align=center| 4:10
| Redmond, Oregon, United States
| 
|-
| Win
| align=center| 4–1
| Trevor Harris
| Submission (rear-naked choke)
| Sport Fight 16: Clash at the Casino
| 
| align=center| 1
| align=center| 1:43
| Pendleton, Oregon, United States
| 
|-
| Win
| align=center| 3–1
| Jason Chuckelnaskit
| Submission (rear-naked choke)
| AX Fighting Championships: Impact
| 
| align=center| 2
| align=center| n/a
| Town and Country, Washington, United States
| 
|-
| Win
| align=center| 2–1
| Noah Thomas
| Submission (rear-naked choke)
| Professional Fighting Association: Pride & Fury 4
| 
| align=center| 1
| align=center| 3:31
| Worley, Idaho, United States
| 
|-
| Win
| align=center| 1–1
| Galen Bush
| TKO (punches)
| AX Fighting Championships: Assault at the Armory
| 
| align=center| n/a
| align=center| n/a
| Everett, Washington, United States
| 
|-
| Loss
| align=center| 0–1
| Ian Loveland
| TKO (doctor stoppage)
| Sport Fight 12: Breakout
| 
| align=center| 2
| align=center| 0:31
| Portland, Oregon, United States
|

Mixed martial arts exhibition record

| Loss
| align=center| 2–1
| Diego Brandão
| KO (punches)
| The Ultimate Fighter: Team Bisping vs. Team Miller
|  (airdate)
| align=center| 1
| align=center| 4:15
| Las Vegas, Nevada, United States
| 
|-
| Win
| align=center| 2–0
| Marcus Brimage
| Submission (rear-naked choke)
| The Ultimate Fighter: Team Bisping vs. Team Miller
|  (airdate)
| align=center| 2
| align=center| 2:55
| Las Vegas, Nevada, United States
| 
|-
| Win
| align=center| 1–0
| Eric Marriott
| Decision (unanimous)
| The Ultimate Fighter: Team Bisping vs. Team Miller
|  (airdate)
| align=center| 1
| align=center| 5:00
| Las Vegas, Nevada, United States
|

See also
 List of current UFC fighters
 List of male mixed martial artists

References

External links 
 
 

American male mixed martial artists
Mixed martial artists from Washington (state)
Featherweight mixed martial artists
Bantamweight mixed martial artists
Mixed martial artists utilizing boxing
Mixed martial artists utilizing collegiate wrestling
Mixed martial artists utilizing Brazilian jiu-jitsu
People from Yakima, Washington
Living people
1984 births
American practitioners of Brazilian jiu-jitsu
People from Goldendale, Washington
Ultimate Fighting Championship male fighters